Mount Nitai (Har Nitai), sometimes spelled Nitay, is a mountain in Israel  situated west of the Sea of Galilee and north of the city of Tiberias. Har Nitai is named after Nittai of Arbela. The cliffs of Nitai and Arbel are visible when looking southwest from Capernaum on the shore of the Sea of Galillee.

History
A valley with a stream through it separates Mount Nitai (Har Nitai) from  Mount Arbel(Har Arbel). The valley is called today in Hebrew 'Arbel' and in Arabic 'Wadi Hamam' ("Valley of the Doves").

On the eastern slope of Mount Nitai, down next to the stream, is an archaeological site, Khirbet Wadi Hamam (Hurvat Vradim is the modern Hebrew name), where an ancient Jewish synagogue has been excavated. The site is identified by some as the ancient Jewish town of Arbel, which moved onto the opposite side of the valley, on the northern side of Mount Arbel, only in the Middle Ages.

Atop Har Nitai is a grove of trees and the ruins of an ancient settlement, identified as the ancient village of Arbel The eastern boundary of the site is marked by the ruins of an ancient wall, and approximately 80 metres east of the wall is a sheer drop-off, or cliff.

References

Nitai